Pocono Mountain Lake Estates is a census-designated place located in Lehman Township, Pike County in the state of Pennsylvania.  The community is located near U.S. Route 209, and is between and shares borders with two other CDP's, Pine Ridge and Pocono Ranch Lands.  As of the 2010 census the population was 842 residents.

Demographics

References

Census-designated places in Pike County, Pennsylvania
Census-designated places in Pennsylvania